Lambert Godfrey (born 1611) was an English politician who sat in the House of Commons between 1654 and 1659.

Godfrey was the eldest son of Thomas Godfrey, of Sellinge, Kent. He matriculated at Hart Hall, Oxford on 4 May 1627, aged 16 and was awarded BA on 19 February 1628. He was incorporated at Cambridge University in 1628 and called to the bar at Gray's Inn in 1636.

In 1654, Godfrey was elected Member of Parliament for Kent in the First Protectorate Parliament. He was re-elected MP for Kent in 1656 for the Second Protectorate Parliament. In 1659 he was elected MP for New Romney in the Third Protectorate Parliament.

References

 

1611 births
Year of death unknown
English MPs 1654–1655
English MPs 1656–1658
English MPs 1659
Alumni of the University of Oxford